Anastasia Valentinovna Voznesenskaya (27 July 1943 – 14 January 2022) was a Russian film and stage actress. She was awarded People's Artist of the Russian Federation in 1997.

Early life and career 
Voznesenskaya was born on 27 July 1943, in Moscow and studied at the Moscow Art Theater School. After graduating from the Studio School in 1965, Voznesenskaya was accepted into the troupe of the Sovremennik Theater. After Oleg Yefremov left Sovremennik, she followed him to the Moscow Art Theater.

She made her film debut in 1965. She became widely known for the main female role in the popular film Major Whirlwind.

Voznesenskaya last appeared on the stage of the Chekhov Moscow Art Theater in May 2013, in the play White Rabbit together with her husband, actor Andrey Myagkov.

Personal life and death 
Voznesenskaya was married to the actor Andrey Myagkov from 1963 until his death in 2021. 

In late December 2021, Voznesenskaya tested positive for COVID-19. She died from the virus in Moscow on 14 January 2022, at the age of 78.

Selected filmography
 No Password Necessary (1967) as Sashenyka Gavrilina
 Major Whirlwind (1967) as Anya
 To Love (1968) as Girl with a globe
 Adam and Eve (1969) as Ishat
 The Garage (1979) as Anna Alekseevna Kushakova, Market Director
 Station for Two (1983) as Yuliya
 Crash – Cop's Daughter (1989) as Vera Nikolayeva, Valeria's mother

References

External links
 
 

1943 births
2022 deaths
20th-century Russian actresses
21st-century Russian actresses
Soviet film actresses
Russian film actresses
Soviet television actresses
Russian television actresses
Soviet stage actresses
Russian stage actresses
Actresses from Moscow
People's Artists of Russia
Honored Artists of the RSFSR
Recipients of the Order of Honour (Russia)
Moscow Art Theatre School alumni
Deaths from the COVID-19 pandemic in Russia